Emanuel Sebastián Vargas Torus (born 13 February 1988) is an Argentine-born Chilean footballer.

Career
In February 2015, he was released from Lota Schwager after having a fight with his fellow Sergio Núñez.

His last club was Iberia.

Personal life

He is the son of Sergio Vargas, former Chile national team goalkeeper.

Honours

Club
Universidad de Chile
 Primera División de Chile (1): 2009 Apertura

References

External links
 
 
 Emanuel Vargas at Football-Lineups

1988 births
Living people
Footballers from Buenos Aires
Argentine footballers
Argentine emigrants to Chile
Naturalized citizens of Chile
Chilean footballers
Universidad de Chile footballers
Deportes Iberia footballers
Lota Schwager footballers
Sportverein Jugendland footballers
Cobresal footballers
Deportes Iquique footballers
Rangers de Talca footballers
Chilean Primera División players
Primera B de Chile players
Association football goalkeepers